Surviving Christmas with the Relatives (also known as Christmas Survival in the United States) is a 2018 British Christmas film written and directed by James Dearden. It stars Julian Ovenden, Gemma Whelan, Joely Richardson and Michael Landes.  It was released in the UK 30 November 2018 and was not well received.

Cast 
Julian Ovenden as Dan
Gemma Whelan as Miranda
Joely Richardson as Lyla
Michael Landes as Trent
Sally Phillips as Miriam
Ronni Ancona as Vicky
Sophie Simnett as Bee
Patricia Hodge as Aunt Peggy
James Fox as Uncle John

See also
 List of Christmas films

References

2018 films
British Christmas comedy films
2010s Christmas comedy films
Films directed by James Dearden
2010s English-language films
2010s British films